Anantanatha was the fourteenth Tirthankara of the present age (Avasarpini) of Jainism. According to Jain beliefs, he became a siddha, a liberated soul which has destroyed all of its karma.

Biography
Anantanatha was the fourteenth Tirthankara of the present age (Avasarpini) of Jainism. According to Jain beliefs, he became a siddha, a liberated soul which has destroyed all of its karma.

Anantanatha was born to King Sinhasena and Queen Suyasha at Ayodhya in the Ikshvaku dynasty. His birth date was the 13th day of the Vaishakha Krishna month of the Indian calendar.

Literature
 Ananthnatha Purana was written by Janna in 1230 CE.

Famous Temple
Anantnath Swami Temple in Kalpetta, Kerala

See also

Tirthankara in Jainism
Jainism and non-creationism

References

Sources
 
 
 

Tirthankaras